"Wish I" is the third single released by Welsh singer Jem from her debut album, Finally Woken. The song has been used as the title music for UK reality TV show, Celebrity Love Island on ITV and ABC's Grey's Anatomy.

Track listing

Wish I Pt. 1
Wish I
Easy Way Out (Carmen Rizzo featuring Jem)

Wish I Pt. 2
Wish I (Album Version)
Wish I (Foreign Dancehall Mix feat. YT)
Wish I (Aphrodite Mix)

Japanese CD
Wish I (Album Version)
Wish I (Foreign Dancehall Mix)
Wish I (Aphrodite Mix)
Just a Ride (ADAM F-V-Pendulum Music Mix)
Just a Ride (Fatboy Slim Remix)

Chart positions

Other appearances
Acoustic 05 (2005, Echo)

2003 songs
2005 singles
Jem (singer) songs
Songs written by Jem (singer)
ATO Records singles